Stenqvist is a Swedish surname. Notable people with the surname include:

Åke Stenqvist (1914–2006), Swedish sprint runner, long jumper, pentathlete, and handball player
Harry Stenqvist (1893–1968), American-born Swedish road racing cyclist
Jakob Stenqvist (born 1998), Swedish ice hockey player

Surnames of Swedish origin